Buckeye–Woodhill is a station on the RTA Blue and Green Lines in Cleveland, Ohio. It is located at the intersection of Woodhill Road, Buckeye Road and Shaker Boulevard.

The station comprises side platforms below grade west of the intersection. Two concrete stairways, one on the north from Buckeye Road and the second on the south from Woodhill Road, lead down to the platforms. There is a small parking lot north of the platforms off Buckeye Road.

History
The station opened on April 11, 1920 as Woodhill, when service commenced on the line west of Shaker Square to East 34th Street and via surface streets to downtown.

The line was constructed with a tunnel under the intersection of Buckeye and Woodhill Roads, which was built without disturbing the automobile and streetcar traffic above. The location of the tunnel dictated the placement of the line.

The material excavated from the cut was used to create an embankment to carry the tracks over the railroad tracks and streets west of Buckeye–Woodhill. The cut and fill provide the means for the trains to traverse the Portage Escarpment that separates much of the city of Cleveland from suburbs such as Shaker Heights and Cleveland Heights.

In 1980 and 1981, the trunk line of the Green and Blue Lines from East 55th Street to Shaker Square was completely renovated with new track, ballast, poles and wiring, and new stations were built along the line. At Buckeye–Woodhill, new platforms were installed, and the wooden stairways were replaced by concrete stairways covered by tinted acrylic glass canopies. The renovated line opened on October 30, 1981.

Between 2011 and 2012, the RTA renovated Buckeye–Woodhill once more with funding received as part of the American Recovery and Reinvestment Act. The platforms were renovated with tactile edges installed, the covered stairways were replaced with ones of a more contemporary design and appearance, and new wheelchair ramps were installed, making the station ADA accessible. The rebuilt station was dedicated on October 23, 2012.'''

Station layout

Notable places nearby
 St. Elizabeth of Hungary Catholic Church
 Weizer Building
 St. Andrew Svorad Abbey

References

External links

Blue Line (RTA Rapid Transit)
Green Line (RTA Rapid Transit)
Railway stations in the United States opened in 1920
1920 establishments in Ohio